Camillo Boccaccino (1511 – 4 January 1546) was an Italian painter of the Renaissance period, active mainly in Cremona and regions of Lombardy.

He was born in Cremona, the son and pupil of the painter Boccaccio Boccaccino. He was known to Gian Paolo Lomazzo and Giorgio Vasari. He painted the four evangelists (1537) in the niches of the cupola of San Sigismondo at Cremona.

References

The Catholic encyclopedia cites Camillo's birthdate as 1511, Wornum as 1508.

1511 births
1546 deaths
16th-century Italian painters
Italian male painters
Painters from Cremona
Renaissance painters